Carlos Mayolo (10 September 1945 – 3 February 2007) was a Colombian actor and film director. He directed more than ten films from 1970 to 2000.

Selected filmography

References

External links 

1945 births
2007 deaths
Colombian film directors